Guam Shooting Sports Federation is a Guamanian association for practical shooting.

See also 
 Guam National Shooting Sports Federation
 Philippine Practical Shooting Association

References

External links 

Regions of the International Practical Shooting Confederation
Practical Shooting